Kate Clark is a New York-based sculptor, residing and working in Brooklyn. Her work synthesizes human faces with the bodies of animals. Clark's preferred medium is animal hide. Mary Logan Barmeyer says Clark's work is "meant to make you think twice about what it means to be human, and furthermore, what it means to be animal." Writer Monica Ramirez-Montagut says Clark's works "reclaim storytelling and vintage techniques as strategies to address contemporary discourses on welfare, the environment, and female struggles."

Education and early career
Kate Clark comes from a background in arts, with her father being a painter. Kate's art of choice was also painting; in fact, she did not get into sculpting until college. In 1994, Kate Clark graduated from Cornell University with a Bachelor of Fine Arts in Sculpture. She went on to obtain a Master of Fine Arts degree from Cranbrook Academy of Art in 2001. Kate began her work by creating a piece called How Are You?, which was featured in the Forum Gallery of the Cranbrook Art Museum in Bloomfield Hills, Michigan. This museum was first open to the public in 1942. Kate had her first solo exhibit at Claire Oliver Gallery in New York in 2008. Since then, Kate has been included in museum exhibitions at the Aldrich Museum of Contemporary Art, The Islip Art Museum, and The Bellevue Arts Museum. Kate had her first solo museum show in 2010 at the Mobile Museum of Art.

Critical reaction
Reviewing "Pretty Tough: Contemporary Storytelling" at The Aldrich Contemporary Art Museum, Ridgefield, CT, Benjamin Genocchio for The New York Times called her work "successful as works of visual theater", praising one work, Matriarch, as "particularly unsettling".

Exhibitions

Solo exhibitions
2010
 Kate Clark: Give and Take, Mobile Museum of Art, Mobile, AL
2008
 Perfect Strangers, Claire Oliver Gallery, New York, NY
2007
 Kate Clark, Hudson D. Walker Gallery, Fine Arts Work Center, Provincetown, MA

Group exhibitions
2016
Dead Animals and the Curious Occurrence of Taxidermy in Contemporary Art, David Winton Bell Gallery - Brown University, Providence, RI

2012
 Fairy Tales, Monsters, and the Genetic Imagination, Frist Center for the Visual Arts, Nashville, TN; Winnipeg Art Gallery, Winnipeg, Manitoba Canada
Glenbow Museum, Calgary, Alberta, Canada

2011
 No Object is an Island: New Dialogues with the Cranbrook Collection, Cranbrook Art Museum, Bloomfield Hills, MI
 The Sum of Their Parts, Shore Institute of the Contemporary Arts, Asbury Park, NJ
 Cute & Creepy, Museum of Fine Arts, Florida State University, Tallahassee, FL
 In Rare Form, Ann Street Gallery, Newburgh, NY

2009
 Art Miami, Claire Oliver Gallery
 NEXT Chicago, Claire Oliver Gallery
 Uber-Portrait, Bellevue Arts Museum, Bellevue, WA
 Pretty Tough: Contemporary Storytelling, The Aldrich Contemporary Art Museum, Ridgefield, CT.

2008
 I Dream of Genomes, Islip Art Museum, East Islip, New York
 New, Next, Now, Claire Oliver Gallery, NY

2007
 Posing, Abrons Art Center, Henry Street Settlement, New York, NY
 Meta-Majesty, Chashama / Explosivo, New York, NY
 SCOPE Hamptons Art Fair, presented by Jack the Pelican Presents, Brooklyn, NY
 Our Dark Heroes, Secret Project Robot, Brooklyn, NY
 Why Look at Animals? Artspace, New Haven, CT
 Fine Arts Work Center Fellows Exhibit, Provincetown Art Museum, Provincetown, MA
 SCOPE, Miami, FL

2006
 MAD COW: Absurdity and Anxiety in Contemporary Culture NURTUREart Gallery, Brooklyn, NY
 SCOPE New York Art Fair, presented by Jack the Pelican Presents, Brooklyn, NY
 Allergy, Gallery Velvet, Seoul, Korea
 2006 Fellows and Jurors, Hudson D. Walker Gallery, Provincetown, MA

2005
 Project Diversity, Tabla Rasa Gallery, Brooklyn, NY, Rush Philanthropic Arts Foundation
 Biennial, Detroit Artists’ Market, Detroit, MI

2003
 A Bestiary, 55 Mercer Gallery, New York, NY
 Member’s Invitational, Detroit Artists’ Market, Detroit, MI

2002
 Biennial, Detroit Artists’ Market 70th Anniversary, Detroit, MI
 Dealer’s Select, Detroit Artists’ Market, Detroit, MI

2001
 Fresh Paint, Robert Kidd Gallery, Birmingham, MI

2000
 Constructed Images, Mott Community College, Flint, MI
 Cranbrook Connection, D’Arcy, Troy, MI
 How Are You? Cranbrook Art Museum, Forum Gallery, Bloomfield Hills, MI

Art pieces
 Goat - 2006
 A Rough Start - 2007
 Antics - 2007
 Pack - 2007
 A Small Disturbance - 2008
 A Map Is Not The Territory - 2008
 Untitled (Black Bear) - 2008
 Little Girl - 2008
 Matriarch - 2009
 Bully - 2010
 Untitled (Female Bust) - 2011

Kate Clark's work has been collected internationally and is in public collections such as the David Roberts Art Foundation in London and the C-Collection in Switzerland. Her awards and residencies are as follows:
Marie Walsh Sharpe Art Foundation, Space Program, New York, Sept 2011- August 2012
Fine Arts Work Center, Winter Fellowship, Provincetown, Massachusetts October 2006 - May 2007
Jentel Artist Residency Program, Banner, Wyoming October - November 2005

References

Living people
American sculptors
Year of birth missing (living people)
Cornell University College of Architecture, Art, and Planning alumni
Cranbrook Educational Community alumni
Taxidermists